Pawn Shop Chronicles, also known as Hustlers, is a 2013 American crime comedy film directed by Wayne Kramer and written by Adam Minarovich. The film stars an ensemble cast, led by Paul Walker, Matt Dillon, Brendan Fraser, Vincent D'Onofrio, Norman Reedus, and Chi McBride. Centering on the events in and around a pawn shop, Pawn Shop Chronicles tells three overlapping stories involving items found within said pawn shop.  This was Walker's final film to be released during his lifetime, as he died four months after its release.

The film received a limited theatrical release in July 2013.

Cast

Production

Fred Durst was originally set to direct.

The movie was filmed in Baton Rouge, Louisiana, in June 2012. The film's carnival scene was filmed at William and Lee Park in Port Allen, Louisiana.

Critical reception
On Rotten Tomatoes it has a 18% approval rating based on reviews from 17 critics. On Metacritic the film has a score of 26 out 100 based on reviews from 10 critics, indicating "generally unfavorable reviews".

Variety called it "A sub-Tarantino triptych of comic-violent tall tales consisting mostly of bad things happening to dumb people." Stephen Holden of The New York Times, said of the film, "Hee Haw meets Pulp Fiction at the meth lab: That describes the style of Pawn Shop Chronicles, a hillbilly grindhouse yawp of a movie that belches in your face and leaves a sour stink."

The film was reviewed favorably by JoBlo.com. For the site, reviewer JimmyO wrote, "Pawn Shop Chronicles is a wildly bizarre and politically incorrect mix of b-movie genres wrapped into one. Kramer – with the script by Minarovich – amps up the action and violence without pushing it too far – well at least for my personally warped taste."

References

External links
 
 

2013 films
2010s crime thriller films
2010s crime comedy films
American independent films
American crime comedy films
American comedy thriller films
Films set in Louisiana
Films directed by Wayne Kramer (filmmaker)
Films scored by the Newton Brothers
2013 comedy films
2010s English-language films
2010s American films